Jan Fießer (born 2 January 1987) is a German footballer he is the currently assistant manager Bundesliga of VfL Bochum.  who plays for Rot-Weiss Frankfurt.

References

External links

1987 births
Living people
German footballers
KSV Hessen Kassel players
SV Wehen Wiesbaden players
SV Sandhausen players
Arminia Bielefeld players
1. FC Saarbrücken players
Rot-Weiss Frankfurt players
2. Bundesliga players
3. Liga players
Association football midfielders
Sportspeople from Heidelberg
Footballers from Baden-Württemberg